Samuel Kyser Teasley (born April 29, 1976) is an American politician. He previously served as a member of the Georgia House of Representatives from January 10, 2011, until January 14, 2019. Teasley sponsored 191 bills. He is a member of the Republican Party. On November 8, 2018, Teasley was defeated by Democrat Mary Frances Williams in a closely contested election.

References

Republican Party members of the Georgia House of Representatives
21st-century American politicians
Living people
People from Marietta, Georgia
1976 births